Below is an incomplete list of science fiction, fantasy, and horror feature films or miniseries on the theme of World War II.

A separate list of TV series appears at the end.

20th century

21st century

2000s

{| class="wikitable sortable" style="width:100%;"
|-
! class="unsortable"|Year
! style="width:  80px;" |Country
! style="width: 160px;" |Main title(Alternative titles)
! style="width: 140px;" |Original title(Original script)
! style="width: 100px;" |Director
! class="unsortable"|Battles, campaigns, events depicted
|-
|2001
|
|The Bunker
|
|Rob Green
|In 1944, in the Belgian - German border, seven German soldiers survive an American attack in the front and lock themselves in a bunker. Under siege by the enemy and with little ammunition, they decide to explore tunnels to seek supplies and find an escape route. While in the tunnel, weird things happen to the group.
|-
|2002
|United States
|Below
|
|David Twohy
|Strange happenings occur on a United States WW II submarine after picking up three survivors from a sunken British hospital ship.
|-
|2002
|United StatesCanadaAustralia
|Return to Never Land
|
|Robin Budd, Donovan Cook
|Animated family adventure based on J.M. Barrie book. Peter Pan rescues young girl from Captain Hook in Never Land during Battle of Britain, 1940; sequel to the 1953 film Peter Pan
|-
|2003
|CubaSpain
|More Vampires in Havana
|Más Vampiros en la Habana|Juan Padrón
| Sequel to the 1985 cuban animated film called Vampires in Havana talks about a Nazi scientist creating an army of Nazi vampires who cause trouble in the city of Havana, Cuba.
|-
|2004
|United States
|Hellboy|
|Guillermo del Toro
|Infant demon summoned from Hell to Earth by Nazi occultists discovered by Allied Forces
|-
|2005
|Japan
|Lorelei: The Witch of the Pacific Ocean|Rōrerai (ローレライ)
|Shinji Higuchi, Cellin Gluck
|Experimental Japanese submarine attempts to prevent atomic bombing of Tokyo
|-
|2006
|Sweden
|Frostbite|Frostbiten|Anders Banke
|Horror comedy. Former SS geneticist attempting to create master breed of vampires in Norrland
|-
|2006
|United Kingdom
|Ghostboat (TV)
|
|Stuart Orme
|Mystery-thriller based on Neal R. Burger novel. Fictional RN submarine presumed lost in Baltic in 1943 resurfaces near end of Cold War, 1981
|-
|2006
|United States
|Horrors of War (Zombies of War)
|
|Peter John Ross, John Whitney
|Action-horror. OSS conducts missions to discover source of Hitler's wunderwaffen and vergeltungswaffen terrorizing Allies
|-
|2006
|SpainMexico
|Pan's Labyrinth|El laberinto del fauno|Guillermo del Toro
|Fantasy/Drama. Parable influenced by fairy tale of young girl's escape into abandoned labyrinth with mysterious faun creature in Francoist Spain, May–June 1944
|-
|2006
|Canada
|War of the Dead|
|Sean Cisterna
|Horror. Special agent investigating deaths of WWII veterans being hunted down by Nazi zombies
|-
|2006
|United States
|SS Doomtrooper|
|David Flores
|Action Sci-Fi. A genetically bred Nazi super soldier fights Allied troops. 
|-
|2007
|United States
|Reign of the Gargoyles (TV)
|
|Ayton Davis
|Action-horror. An American aircrew join forces with British soldiers and local townsfolk to battle living gargoyles and the German army
|-
|2008
|United Kingdom
|Outpost|
|Steve Barker
|Action-horror. Mercenaries on Eastern European mission battling mysterious Nazi evil in old Nazi bunker
|-
|2008
|United States
|WarBirds (TV)
|
|Kevin Gendreau
|American air crew in Pacific Theatre meet pterosaurs
|-
|2009
|Norway
|Dead Snow|Død snø|Tommy Wirkola
|Horror-comedy. SS troops killed in Norway reanimate into zombies terrorizing a modern-day wilderness vacation
|-
|2009
|RussiaJapanCanada
|First Squad|Pervyy otryad (Первый отряд) ; Fāsuto sukuwaddo ファースト・スクワッド 
|Yoshiharu Ashino
|Anime. Set during the Eastern Front, featuring Soviet teenagers with extraordinary abilities that are opposed by a supernatural army of crusaders
|-
|2009
|United States
||
|C. Thomas Howell
|SF based on Edgar Rice Burroughs novel. Stranded U-boat crew in time void on island inside Bermuda Triangle; loosely made re-make of similarly titled 1975 film
|-
|2009
|United States
|Blood Creek (Town Creek)
|
|Joel Schumacher
|Horror-thriller. Brothers on revenge mission in rural West Virginia where Nazi professor has been waging occult war since 1936
|}

2010s

2020s

In development

Other films
In Paul Verhoeven's 1997 film Starship Troopers, the troopship is named the Rodger Young'', after Medal of Honor recipient Rodger Wilton Young.

TV series

Dramatized documentary

See also
 List of World War II films
 List of science fiction films
 List of fantasy films
 List of horror films

References

Science fiction, fantasy, and horror films
 
World War II